Rønnede is a town in Faxe Municipality, in Region Zealand, Denmark. Prior to the Kommunalreformen ("The Municipality Reform" of 2007), it was the municipal seat of Rønnede Municipality.

Notable people 
 Philip Smidth (1855 in Rønnede – 1938) a Danish architect of commercial properties, high-end apartment buildings, hotels and hospitals in the Historicist style

Notes 

Cities and towns in Region Zealand
Faxe Municipality